The Old Georgetown City Hall, also known as Georgetown Police Station, is a two-story brick construction building designed by Victor W. Voorhees in the Georgetown neighborhood of Seattle, Washington that was built in 1909.

It was designed to include a police court, a jail, fire department, council chambers, and offices for mayor, engineer, and treasurer.  It was to be the first building in Georgetown with hot and cold running water.  Georgetown was annexed into Seattle in 1910.

It was listed on the National Register of Historic Places in 1983.

References

External links
 

1909 establishments in Washington (state)
Buildings and structures in Seattle
1900s architecture in the United States
City and town halls on the National Register of Historic Places in Washington (state)
City halls in Washington (state)
Georgetown, Seattle
Government buildings completed in 1909
National Register of Historic Places in Seattle